The Blisworth Clay Formation is a geological formation in England. It is part of the Great Oolite Group and was deposited in the Bathonian stage of the Middle Jurassic. The predominant lithology is mudstone with thin beds of limestone and sandstone with ironstone nodules. Towards the South-West it laterally transitions into the Forest Marble Formation.

References

Jurassic England
Rock formations of England
Geologic formations of the United Kingdom
Jurassic System of Europe
Bathonian Stage